Brinson Paolini (born January 8, 1991) is an American professional golfer.

Brinson was born in Boise, Idaho and grew up in Virginia Beach, Virginia. He has won the Virginia Amateur four times. He played college golf at Duke University.

Brinson turned professional in 2013 and began playing on the Challenge Tour. He finished in a tie for second in his first event, the Swiss Challenge, and won the third event he played in, the Le Vaudreuil Golf Challenge.

Amateur wins
2008 Virginia Amateur
2009 Virginia Amateur
2010 Virginia Amateur
2013 Virginia Amateur

Professional wins (1)

Challenge Tour wins (1)

See also
2013 European Tour Qualifying School graduates

References

External links

American male golfers
Duke Blue Devils men's golfers
European Tour golfers
Golfers from Idaho
Golfers from Virginia
Sportspeople from Boise, Idaho
Sportspeople from Virginia Beach, Virginia
1991 births
Living people